Blues for the Viet Cong is the debut album led by American jazz pianist Stanley Cowell recorded in 1969 and first released on the British Polydor label then later released on the Freedom label.

Reception

In his review for AllMusic, Scott Yanow states "Cowell's style at the time was often modal and already quite powerful".

Track listing
All compositions by Stanley Cowell except as indicated
 "Departure" - 7:08
 "Sweet Song" - 3:02
 "The Shuttle" - 8:07
 "You Took Advantage of Me" (Richard Rodgers, Lorenz Hart) - 4:47
 "Blues for the Viet Cong" - 4:18
 "Wedding March" - 2:49
 "Photon in a Paper World" - 9:03
 "Travellin' Man" - 3:34

Personnel
Stanley Cowell - piano
Steve Novosel - bass
Jimmy Hopps - drums

References

1969 debut albums
Stanley Cowell albums
Freedom Records albums
Polydor Records albums